Laxmanpur is a village in Vaishali district within the Indian state of Bihar. The nearest railway station is Desari, which is 13 kilometres from the main village.

Geography
Laxmanpur is located in the sub Himalayan zone, in the northeastern part of India, in an alluvial fertile plain drained by the Ganges, which flows from west to east, and its tributaries Gandak and Koshi, that regularly flood parts of the surrounding plains.

Climate
Laxmanpur has a humid subtropical climate (Köppen: Cwa), with very hot summers and cool winters. 
The monsoon season begins in late June and ends in late September.

Crops
It is rich of weeds, such as ammannia and sesbania, and other plants and trees like mango orchards, palmyra and date palms, siris, jackfruits and red cotton trees. The cultivated area produces bananas, lychees, mango, bamboo,  rice, sugarcane and other food grains.

A canal passes from Laxmanpur for irrigation.

Administration
Laxmanpur is situated in Laxmipur Brahambatta Panchyat. The police station for Laxmanpur is in Jandaha. 

The Member of the Legislative Assembly (MLA) Lt.Raj Kishore Sinha(1995-2000 Vaishali Assembly Constituency) was from Laxmanpur.

See also
 List of villages in Vaishali district

References

Villages in Vaishali district